In legal usage, "immediately" forms several compounds based on its conventional definitions.

Conventional definitions

Courts have used immediately to mean "Promptly, with expedition, with reasonable haste consistent with fair business activity." 46 Am J1st Sales § 163.
As used in a request made to a carrier for freight cars: -- at once. 13 Am J2d Car § 153.
As an adverb of time in the clause of an accident policy providing for certain indemnity in case of injury causing total disability "immediately": -- proximity of time with the injury, as presently, or without any substantial interval between the accident and the disability. 29A Am J Rev ed Ins § 1526.
As a limitation of time for the commencement of an action: -- within a reasonable time and without unnecessary delay.
Putnam v Putnam, 86 Mont 135, 282 P 855.
 
Courts, looking at the substance of contracts and statutes, have, during the last two centuries, repeatedly declared that the word "immediately," although in strictness it excludes all meantimes, yet to make good the deeds and intents of the parties, it shall be construed "such convenient time as is reasonably requisite for doing the thing."  Anno: 16 ALR 609.

Compounds

Immediate injury – An injury resulting directly from an act rather than an injury ensuing the act. (e.g. Mulchanock v. Whitehall Cement Manufacturing Co., 253 Pa. 262, 98 A. 554 (1916).)
Immediate disability
Immediately adjacent – Adjoining or abutting, rather than in the vicinity. (e.g. Parsons v. Wethersfield, 135 Conn. 24, 60 A.2d 771, 4 A.L.R.2d 330 (1948) — term in a statutory provision requiring a unanimous vote of the commission on a question of rezoning property over the protest of 20 per cent of the owners of lots "immediately adjacent".)  
Immediately due at the option of the holder – Immediately due upon or after the holder's election to exercise the option. (e.g. Damet v. Aetna Life Ins. Co., 71 Okla. 122, 179 P. 760, 5 A.L.R. 434.)
Immediately on demand – Payment after a reasonable opportunity for complying with the demand. (e.g. 40 Am. Jur. Paym § 15.)  
Immediate payment
Immediately upon arrival – Phrase appearing in directions to a factor to sell goods; as soon after arrival as a sale can be made, irrespective of loss, the factor being precluded from exercising his discretion. (e.g. Courcier v. Ritter, 6 F. Cas. No. 3,282.)
Immediately dangerous to life or health

Legal terminology